Szymon Hołownia's Poland 2050 (PL2050) is a centrist political party in Poland.

It was founded as a social movement in 2020, shortly after the presidential election. It was officially registered as a political party in April 2021. Since it was founded after the previous parliamentary election, it hasn't participated in any parliamentary elections, although eight MPs have defected to Poland 2050 in the Sejm. It is ideologically supportive of green politics and Christian democratic principles, and it also combines some elements of liberalism, social democracy, and conservatism.

History

The first indication that Szymon Hołownia planned to establish a social movement appeared in February 2020, when he led a campaign for the 2020 presidential election. Hołownia officially announced the formation of a new movement on 30 June 2020, two days after the first round of elections, in which he was placed 3rd with a result of less than 14% of votes. The organisation was registered on 24 August 2020, and five days later it was officially introduced. According to Szymon Hołownia, 20,000 people joined the movement.

On 29 September 2020, Szymon Hołownia announced the creation of a political party associated with the movement, led by Michał Kobosko, whose registration (under the name "Poland 2050 by Szymon Hołownia") was filed with the District Court in Warsaw on 3 November 2020.

In November 2020, the party gained its first MP in the Sejm: Hanna Gill-Piątek from the Spring party. By the end of the year, the party got between 10 and 20 percent in opinion polls, which made it the third most popular party in Poland. By the end of the year, Gill-Piątek and Jacek Kozlowski became the party's Deputy Chair.

On 8 January 2021, the party gained another representative in the Sejm (Joanna Mucha) and its first Senator (Jacek Bury). Both these members initially were members of Civic Platform, which was main party of the Civic Coalition. On the same day, members of the Elk City Council and the Elk Poviat Council, including its chair Andrzej Wiszowaty, who were members of the local party Dobto Wspólne created the Poland 2020 Local Councillors club.

In February 2021, yet another member of the Civic Coalition (Paulina Hennig-Kloska of the Modern party) joined ranks of Poland 2050 in the Sejm. This allowed the movement to create its own Sejm circle. In March, another MP joined the party, an Independent politician and a famous journalist Tomasz Zimoch.

On 7 April 2021, Szymon Hołownia's Poland 2050 officially registered as a political party. Thirteen days later another member of Modern, Mirosław Suchoń, joined Poland 2050. On 20 May 2021, a former member of the government and Agreement, Wojciech Maksymowicz, joined the party and its group in Sejm, after he was attacked by the government media of performing medical research using aborted fetuses. On 28 October 2021 Paweł Zalewski, an MP expelled from Civic Platform due to his conservative stances joined PL2050.

Poland 2050, through MEP Roza Thun, officially joined the Renew Europe group in the European Parliament on 10 November 2021.

Ideology and position 
The party is considered to be positioned in the centre on the political spectrum, although generally its policies span from the centre-left to the centre-right. It is also seen as a catch-all party. Ideologically, it pursues green politics, and it combines elements of Christian democracy, liberalism, and social democracy. It has been also described by some as conservative, moderate-conservative, and Christian-democratic. It supports Poland's membership in the European Union.

Environmental policies 
It believes that by 2050 at the latest, Poland should achieve carbon neutrality. They have also stated support for the European Green Deal. Hołownia announced during the presidential campaign in 2020 that "miners should be protected, and not the mines". He declared that his presidency "will be the green presidency" and that "the natural environment is one of the priorities".

In March 2021, the "Poland on the Green Trail" program was presented. Its main objectives are to reduce greenhouse gas emissions by 45% by 2030, move away from coal by 2040 and achieve carbon neutrality in 2050. It has also proposed that the minister responsible for energy transformation should have the rank of deputy prime minister and head the Committee of the Council of Ministers for decarbonization of the economy. A "green light" procedure would be introduced into the government's legislative process, which would block laws that increase emissions and have a negative impact on the climate.

Domestic policies 
The party aims for the Senate to become a "self-government chamber" in which, apart from elected senators, representatives of local governments at various levels would be represented: voivodeship marshals, city presidents, village heads and mayors. It is also against the centralization of Poland. Hołownia announced that he would act for the independence of judges and the independence of courts and the separation of the functions of the minister of justice and prosecutor general. The movement calls for a relief for judges and the creation of "courts of first contact". Hołownia supports the liquidation of the Church Fund.

Foreign policy 
It supports the European Union, and strengthening relations with France and Germany. Hołownia stated that "Poland should not look for enemies in foreign policy, but allies".

Members 

Szymon Hołownia – the founder and leader of the movement
Michał Kobosko – the chairman of the party
Joanna Mucha – member of the Sejm
Paulina Hennig-Kloska – member of the Sejm
Paweł Zalewski – member of the Sejm
Tomasz Zimoch – member of the Sejm
Mirosław Suchoń – member of the Sejm
Michał Gramatyka – member of the Sejm
Jacek Bury – member of the Senate
Roza Thun - member of the European Parliament

Electoral history

Mayoral

References

Notes

2020 establishments in Poland
Christian democratic parties in Poland
Environmentalism in Poland
Political movements in Poland
Political parties established in 2020
Political parties in Poland
Pro-European political parties in Poland